Chonburi B Football Club is the reserve team of Chonburi they play in the Thai League 4 Eastern Region.

Stadium and locations for team B

Season by season record for team B

Players

Current squad

External links
 Official Website 
 English Language Website: www.clubwebsite.co.uk/chonburifc/  
 Thai Premier League Information 

Reserves and Academy
Chonburi
Football clubs in Thailand
Sport in Chonburi province
Association football clubs established in 1997
1997 establishments in Thailand